"Not Giving Up" is a 2014 single by The Saturdays.

Not Giving Up may also refer to:
"Not Giving Up", song by Leo Graham
"Not Giving Up", song by Daniel Merriweather from Love & War
"Not Giving Up", song by Royal Wood from We Were Born to Glory  
"Not Giving Up", song by Yolanda Adams from Becoming 
"Not Giving Up", song by Amy Grant from How Mercy Looks from Here
"Not Givin' Up", song by After Class

See also
"Not Giving Up on Love", song by Sophie Ellis-Bextor from Make a Scene
"No Giving Up", song by Crossfade from Crossfade